Outpost: Black Sun, also known as Outpost 2, is a 2012 British war horror film directed by Steve Barker, based on a script written by himself and Rae Brunton. It is a sequel to Barker's 2008 film Outpost. The film was later followed by Outpost: Rise of the Spetsnaz, the third entry in the series.

Plot
Nazi-hunter Lena trails a World War II German scientist Neurath to Paraguay, who worked with a war-criminal named Klausener. While interrogating Neurath, he suffers a fatal heart attack after taunting her about an active cabal of Nazi loyalists. She searches his apartment and finds a map of the former Yugoslavia, documents relating to British engineer Francis Hunt, and a ring with a retractable key embedded in the signet.

Meanwhile, the same team of mercenaries who arrived at the end of the first film breach the outpost and manoeuvre into the complex. An elderly Klausener watches via a direct feed from a helmet-cam as they are promptly attacked and slaughtered by a battalion of zombie Nazi troops, led by SS Brigadefuhrer Götz.

In the former Yugoslavia Lena runs into Wallace, an ambiguous acquaintance and physicist seeking truth about the unified field theory; he believes Hunt and his team are dead and that no one should control what they were searching for, Die Glocke. He explains that a NATO rapid reaction force has been secretly battling the undead SS guards, who have been slaughtering villagers across the region and inflicting heavy casualties. According to a contact in a local militia group, a reality bending electromagnetic field has been steadily expanding across the countryside with the source at the outpost bunker.

Lena and Wallace trek to the militia camp, to find it under attack from the SS, with the militiamen and NATO soldiers stationed there slaughtered, including Wallace's contact. Hiding under a soldier's corpse, Lena witnesses an SS-Mann brutally kill a militiaman. The next morning Lena and Wallace discover NATO forces failed to set off an EMP to disable the machine protecting the SS guards. Continuing through the countryside they discover devastated villages. Wallace explains his knowledge from his journal of runic symbols and history about Black Sun - the Wunderwaffe group responsible for creating Die Glocke. They run into an undead SS group but are saved by a British SAS fireteam led by Macavoy and Abbot, with Carlise, Hall and engineer Tech; the latter recognises Wallace but dies in a skirmish whilst setting up an EMP to disable the attacking SS. The British enlist Wallace as their engineer and Macavoy orders Lena to leave them until reinforcements arrive.

Lena follows them and helps them survive another SS attack. They begrudgingly allow her to join, explaining their mission is to secure Die Glocke before a tactical nuclear strike is launched on the bunker. They reach the outpost and trace the cabling to reach Die Glockes engine room, but discover the machine has been moved. Hunt's documents and equations are graffitied on the walls, leading Wallace to deduces Klausner's people hired Hunt to retrieve the device. The soldiers are attacked by an SS guard and Macavoy is killed. Wallace determines Die Glocke was moved deeper into the bunker via a lift hidden behind the chamber's forward wall; Abbot, now in command, orders Hall to set-up flares giving the all-clear for the NATO strike once they evacuate.

The lift takes them underground where they find bodies of locals and mercenary dumped in piles by the SS, led by an undead SS matron. Carlise distracts them and saves Lena from being discovered, but he is stabbed to death by the matron. Wallace locates the control schematics and points them to the containment chamber; Abbot and Lena find Hunt's body hardwired to Die Glocke'''s large generator that controls the undead SS; Götz has managed to increase the generator's electro-magnetic emission range, enabling his battalion to expand beyond the bunker's initial containment field. Abbot is killed in an ambush whilst Hall is caught in a struggle with an SS-Mann and accidentally sets off the flares; With communications down via the EMP field, they are unable to call-off the launch. Wallace manages to trip an EMP wave that temporarily disables all nearby SS guards.

Hunt, barely alive, reveals the machine's unified field core device could only be powered down by Black Sun personnel who had the operating keys. Lena produces Neurath's ring with the key to deactivate the core but is stopped by Götz. Wallace is saved by Hall and they go to find the others. Götz prepares to inject Lena but Hunt uses his last remaining life force to discharge the core's containment energy into the reviving SS platoon. Lena grabs the key and shuts down the waves of esotericism energy containing the guards; Götz manages to hold-off Hunt's attack but is beaten and his skull smashed by Lena, destroying him. She retrieves Die Glockes field containment core and rendezvous with Wallace and Hall in the lift. Wallace suddenly executes Hall and wounds Lena, leaving her to die and escapes just before the outpost is bombed.

Sometime later, Wallace meets Klausner with one half the core as a bargaining chip in case he is double-crossed, whilst holding the other half at an auction. He suddenly receives a call from Lena, who survived the strike by hiding deep underground in the bunker; She warns him she is coming for him and Klausner.

Cast
Catherine Steadman as Lena
Richard Coyle as Wallace
Clive Russell as Marius
Daniel Caltagirone as Macavoy
Gary Abbot as Abbot
Ali Craig as Hall
Nick Nevern as Carlise
Johnny Meres as SS Brigadeführer Götz
Julian Wadham as Francis Hunt
Michael Byrne as Neurath
Martin Bell as Young Neurath
David Gant as Klausener

 Production 
Original Outpost producers Kieran Parker and Arabella Croft were joined by Matador producer Nigel Thomas for this sequel.

Filming took place at the old Lockerbie Academy (prior to its demolition), Kirkcudbright Army Training Area and on the Balmaghie estate near Castle Douglas.

Reception
Critical reception for Outpost: Black Sun has been negative. What Culture panned the film overall stating that although it initially held promise, the film "devolves into tedious trotting around dilapidated German villages" and that "even if the direction and performances are generally decent for a film of the type, it plays out like a dull mission from a particularly naff first-person-shooter video game, until an absurd final boss – a super-Nazi hooked up to electricity – appears, and makes it even more difficult to take seriously". In contrast, Anton Bitel of Little White Lies'' was positive in his review and praised the film's performances and production values.

References

External links 
 

2012 films
2012 horror films
British horror films
Glasgow
Scottish English
Scottish films
English-language Scottish films
Nazi zombie films
Horror war films
Films shot in Scotland
Films set in Croatia
2010s English-language films
Films directed by Steve Barker
2010s British films
Films set in bunkers